Dan Turner may refer to:

Dan Turner (AIDS activist)
Dan Turner (director) (born 1968), film director
Dan Turner (footballer) (born 1998), English soccer player
Dan Turner, Hollywood Detective, pulp magazine fictional character
Dan W. Turner, 25th Governor of Iowa
Dan Turner (Manitoba politician)
Dan Turner (rugby union), Scottish rugby union player

See also
Daniel Turner (disambiguation)